Chris Okoh may refer to:

Chris Okoh (boxer) (born 1969), British boxer
Chris Okoh (footballer) (born 1976), Maltese footballer